Baghao is a town and union council of Barkhan District in the Balochistan province of Pakistan. The area has some of the most productive soil in the district.

References

Populated places in Barkhan District
Union councils of Balochistan, Pakistan